Betsey (or Betsy), was launched in 1801 at Calcutta, India. She made one voyage for the British East India Company (EIC) as Betsey. Around 1814 she sailed to England and was sold to English owners who renamed her Marquis of Wellington. As Marquis of Wellington she made a second voyage for the EIC after transporting convicts to New South Wales. She was returning to England in 1818 when she was wrecked near Margate.

Betsey
Edward Bacon (of Hudson & Bacon), Calcutta, in 1801 launched Betsey for his own account. On 10 February 1802 Captain W.W. Bampton (or Brampton) left Calcutta for London with a cargo of rice. Betsey passed Saugor on 10 March and reached St Helena on 30 June. She arrived at Deptford on 20 September.

On 6 December Betsey sailed from London to return to the local trade in India.

In 1814 or so her owners sold her and her new owners, in London, named her Marquis of Wellington. She was admitted to the Registry of Great Britain on 6 May 1814. She first appears in Lloyd’s Register in 1814, with owner D. Isbister & Co.

Marquis of Wellington
Marquis of Wellington made one trip for the EIC in which she transported convicts to New South Wales and then carried a cargo back from China to Portsmouth. On this voyage she made the first recorded European contact with Mokil Atoll (Mwoakilloa Atoll).

Under the command of George Betham (or Bitham), she sailed from Portsmouth, England, on 1 September 1814.  On 11 November Marquis of Wellington reached Rio de Janeiro. She then stayed there for some three weeks. Marquis of Wellington arrived at Port Jackson on 27 January 1815. 

She had embarked 200 or 199 male convicts, of whom two or one died. Sources agree that 198 landed. A detachment from the 46th Regiment of Foot provided the guard; the regiment was transferring to Australia to replace the 73rd Regiment of Foot (1st Battalion Highlanders). 

Marquis of Wellington left Port Jackson on 4 April, bound for China.

Marquis of Wellington arrived at Whampoa on 4 June. Homeward bound, she crossed the Second Bar on 12 July. She reached Batavia on 5 September and St Helena on 10 November, before arriving back at Portsmouth on 26 December.

Fate
On 21 November 1817, Lloyd's List reported that Marquis of Wellington, Nichols, master, had arrived at Bengal in a damaged state and been taken into dock. She was expected to be able to take on a cargo in June.

Marquis of Wellington was driven onshore on 4 March 1818 on the Mouse Sand, with the loss of two masts, when she was caught in a gale that also caused difficulties to many other vessels along the coast of England. Five days later she was abandoned as a total wreck. Marquis of Wellington, Nichols, master, had been sailing from Bengal to London. Part of her cargo was gotten off and taken to Whitstable and Margate.

Citations

References
 
 
 
 
 
 

1801 ships
British ships built in India
Convict ships to New South Wales
Ships of the British East India Company
Maritime incidents in 1818